Altererythrobacter rubellus is a Gram-negative, strictly aerobic, rod-shaped and non-motile bacterium from the genus of Altererythrobacter which has been isolated from seawater from Korea.

References 

Sphingomonadales
Bacteria described in 2020